Choi Hye-sook (born 21 January 1971) is a South Korean speed skater. She competed in two events at the 1988 Winter Olympics.

References

1971 births
Living people
South Korean female speed skaters
Olympic speed skaters of South Korea
Speed skaters at the 1988 Winter Olympics
Place of birth missing (living people)